The 2003 Women's European Water Polo Championship was the tenth edition of the bi-annual event, organised by the Europe's governing body in aquatics, the Ligue Européenne de Natation. The event took place in Ljubljana, Slovenia from June 7 to June 14, 2003.

There were two qualification tournaments ahead of the event, held from April 11 to April 13, 2003 in Hamburg, Germany (with Greece, Germany, France, and Ukraine competing) and Eindhoven, Netherlands (Netherlands, Spain, Czech Republic and Great Britain).

Qualification

Teams

Group A
 
 

 

Group B

Preliminary round

Group A

Group B

Quarterfinals

Semifinals

Finals
June 14, 2003 —  Bronze Medal

June 14, 2003 —  Gold Medal

Final ranking

Individual awards
Most Valuable Player
???
Best Goalkeeper
???
Best Scorer
Daniëlle de Bruijn (NED) 15 goals

References
 Results

Women
2003
International water polo competitions hosted by Slovenia
Women's water polo in Slovenia
European Championship
Water polo
Sport in Ljubljana
June 2003 sports events in Europe